Heyran Rural District is a rural district (dehestan) in the Central District of Astara County, Gilan Province, Iran. At the 2006 census, its population was 3,061, in 678 families. The rural district has 20 villages.

References 

Rural Districts of Gilan Province
Astara County